German submarine U-14 was a Type IIB U-boat of Nazi Germany's Kriegsmarine during World War II. It served with 3rd U-boat Flotilla from 18 January 1936 to 31 October 1939. U-14 completed six wartime patrols and sank nine ships totalling .

Design
German Type IIB submarines were enlarged versions of the original Type IIs. U-14 had a displacement of  when at the surface and  while submerged. She had two shafts and two  propellers.

U-14 was fitted with three  torpedo tubes at the bow, five torpedoes or up to twelve Type A torpedo mines, and a  anti-aircraft gun. The boat had a complement of twentyfive.

Service history
Early in the war, on 3 September 1939, U-14 attacked a Polish submarine and claimed to have sunk it. In reality the Polish submarine, was not damaged as the torpedo launched by U-14 exploded prematurely.

After serving on six operational patrols, U-14 was used as a training boat and transferred to U-boat training flotillas, serving with the 23rd and 24th U-boat Flotillas until the end of the war. Despite the high casualties suffered by the Unterseebootwaffen (German submarine arm), U-14 suffered no known casualties during the war.

U-14 was scuttled on 5 May 1945 at Wilhelmshaven.

Summary of raiding history

References

Bibliography

External links

German Type II submarines
U-boats commissioned in 1936
World War II submarines of Germany
1935 ships
Ships built in Kiel
Military units and formations of Nazi Germany in the Spanish Civil War
Operation Regenbogen (U-boat)
Maritime incidents in May 1945